Orfeo Cecconato, OAM (1 November 1969)  is an Australian wheelchair basketball player.  He was born in Melbourne, Victoria. He was part of the gold medal-winning Australia men's national wheelchair basketball team at the 1996 Summer Paralympics, for which he received a Medal of the Order of Australia.  In 2000, he received an Australian Sports Medal.

References

Australian people of Italian descent
Paralympic wheelchair basketball players of Australia
Paralympic gold medalists for Australia
Wheelchair category Paralympic competitors
Wheelchair basketball players at the 1996 Summer Paralympics
Recipients of the Medal of the Order of Australia
Recipients of the Australian Sports Medal
Living people
Medalists at the 1996 Summer Paralympics
1969 births
Paralympic medalists in wheelchair basketball